Stefan Edberg  was the reigning champion of the singles event at the ABN World Tennis Tournament and, seeded first, successfully defended his title after a 7–6, 6–2 win in the final against third-seeded Miloslav Mečíř.

Seeds
A champion seed is indicated in bold text while text in italics indicates the round in which that seed was eliminated.

  Stefan Edberg (champion)
  Jimmy Connors (quarterfinals)
  Miloslav Mečíř (final)
  Emilio Sánchez (first round)
  Henri Leconte (first round)
  Claudio Mezzadri (quarterfinals)
  Tomáš Šmíd (first round)
  Jonas Svensson (quarterfinals)

Draw

References

External links
 ITF tournament edition details

Singles